2006 Emperor's Cup Final was the 86th final of the Emperor's Cup competition. The final was played at National Stadium in Tokyo on January 1, 2007. Urawa Reds won the championship.

Match details

See also
2006 Emperor's Cup

References

Emperor's Cup
2006 in Japanese football
Urawa Red Diamonds matches
Gamba Osaka matches